Lucy Ann Cohu (born 2 October 1970) is an English stage and film actress, known for portraying Princess Margaret in The Queen's Sister, Evelyn Brogan in Cape Wrath and Alice Carter in Torchwood: Children of Earth.

Background
Lucy Ann Cohu was born in Wiltshire in 1970. She attended a boarding school, Stamford High School, as a child, and went on to train at the Central School of Speech and Drama. Cohu said that, despite her family's strong military background, her parents were entirely supportive of her desire to be an actress. Cohu lives in Kensal Green in Brent, London.

Personal life
Cohu was married to the actor Corey Johnson, but later divorced.

Television and film work
Before she made a living from acting she used to perform for children's parties. She has been quoted as saying that had she not found success as an actress she would have gone into children's nursing.

Cohu's first acting job after graduating from drama school was at the Royal Exchange Theatre in Manchester, in a production of Jane Austen's Pride and Prejudice. She made her television debut in an episode of Casualty. She went on to work extensively in television, including playing the role Major Jessica Bailey in the popular ITV show Soldier Soldier followed by many parts in British television. In 2005 she portrayed Princess Margaret in the semi-fictional version of her life, The Queen's Sister, for Channel 4, for which she was nominated for Emmy and BAFTA awards. She was widely praised for the role; for example, Variety disliked the "somewhat tawdry biopic", but said that "Cohu makes it all worth watching". Cohu herself said she played Margaret like a proper woman with an insatiable and tremendous energy for life: previous images in her mind had been of a bloated and sick elderly princess confined to a wheelchair. She hoped the production hadn't offended anyone as she really liked the Queen.

Cohu has also appeared in Cape Wrath, Ballet Shoes, as Theo Danes, and Torchwood: Children of Earth, as Alice Carter, the daughter of Captain Jack Harkness.

Cohu has also appeared in several films, including Gosford Park and Becoming Jane.

She plays Madame Maigret in the ITV television series Maigret starring Rowan Atkinson.

Theatre work
In 2018 Cohu appeared in a production of Speaking in Tongues at the Duke of York's Theatre, opposite John Simm, Ian Hart and Kerry Fox. Cohu received positive reviews for this performance. In February 2010 she began a five-week run in a production of An Enemy of the People at the Crucible Theatre, starring alongside Sir Antony Sher as Katrina Stockmann, and later appeared in Arthur Miller's Broken Glass at the Tricycle Theatre. She is due to appear in Dawn King’s play ‘The Trials’ at the Donmar Warehouse in London from the 12th August 2022 to the 27th August.

Awards
In November 2008 Cohu won an international Emmy award for Best Actress for her role in the true-life drama Forgiven.

Filmography

Television

Film

References

External links
 

1968 births
Living people
English film actresses
English television actresses
English stage actresses
Actresses from Wiltshire
Actors from Swindon
Actresses from London
People educated at Stamford High School, Lincolnshire
Alumni of the Royal Central School of Speech and Drama
International Emmy Award for Best Actress winners
20th-century English actresses
21st-century English actresses